Minuscule 35 (in the Gregory-Aland numbering), δ309 (von Soden), is a Greek minuscule manuscript of the New Testament, written on 328 parchment leaves. Paleographically it has been assigned to the 11th century. The manuscript has complex contents, marginalia, and many corrections.

Description 

The codex contains the entire New Testament with many corrections. The order of books: Gospels, Acts, Catholic epistles, Pauline epistles, and Book of Revelation. The text is written in 1 column per page, in 27 lines per page. It has Homilie of Chrysostomos at the end of the Pauline epistles.

There is no division according to the smaller Ammonian Sections with references to the Eusebian Canons.

It has lectionary equipment for the Acts, the Euthalian Apparatus for the Catholic and Pauline epistles, and scholia for the Book of Revelation.

Text 

It has very regular orthography, and differs only slightly from familiar printed editions of the Byzantine text. Currently it is considered to be one of the best witness of the Byzantine text-type, and became the basis for The Gospel According to John in the Byzantine Tradition. Wilbur N. Pickering believes subgroup 35 is the original text of the entire New Testament and has published The Greek New Testament According to Family 35. 

According to Hermann von Soden it is a member of the textual family Family Kr. According to the Claremont Profile Method it represents textual family Kr in Luke 1 and Luke 20. In Luke 10 no profile was made. It creates the subgroup 35.

To the subgroup 35 (lacks reading 37 in Luke 1) belong the manuscripts: 141, 170, 204, 394, 402, 516 (corr), 521, 553, 660 (corr), 758 (prima manu), 769, 797, 928, 1250, 1482, 1487, 1493, 1559, 1572, 1600, 1694 (prima manu), 2204, 2261, and 2554.

In 1 Corinthians 2:4 it reads πειθοι σοφιας (plausible wisdom), the reading is supported only by Old-Latin manuscripts Codex Augiensis and Codex Boernerianus.

For publication in The Gospel According to John in the Byzantine Tradition the text of the manuscript was changed in only 18 places in the Gospel of John. In 10 places a different orthography was adopted:
 4:9 συχρωνται changed to συγχρωνται
 5:8 εγερται changed to εγειρε
 5:8 κραββατον changed to κραβαττον
 5:9 κραββατον changed to κραβαττον
 5:10 κραββατον changed to κραβαττον
 5:11 κραββατον changed to κραβαττον
 5:12 κραββατον changed to κραβαττον
 12:6 εμελλεν changed to εμελεν
 18:23 δαιρεις changed to δερεις
 20:16 ραβουνι changed to ραββουνι
In 8 places the edited text follows the corrector instead of the first hand because of an error of the first hand:
 4:13 υδατος 35* τουτο 35c
 4:18 ο 35* ον 35c
 10:1 αμην 35* αμην αμην 35c
 10:16 [3 blank spaces] 35* εχω α ουκ εστιν 35c
 10:25 αυτοις αυτοις 35* αυτοις 35c
 12:2 om. 35* ην 35c
 16:17 om. 35* υπαγω 35c
 16:19 om. 35* ειπον 35c
Sometimes scribe of 35 presented alternative to the running text. In these four instances the editors preferred to leave the uncorrected text as the base text and note the correction in the critical apparatus:
 5:4 εταρασσε το 35* εταρασσετο το 35c
 14:3 ετοιμασω 35* ετοιμασαι 35c
 19:38 ο ιωσηφ 35* ιωσηφ 35c
 21:15 om. 35* ο ιησους 35c

Also, in the edition the text John 7:53-8:11 is marked on the margin by an obelus (÷). This is in conformity with the practice of the manuscript itself.

History 

The manuscript was dated to the 11th or 12th century. Currently it has been assigned by the INTF to the 11th century.

Formerly it was held at the Athos peninsula in Great Lavra. Between 1643 and 1653 the manuscript was acquired for the collection of Pierre Séguier (1588-1672), the great-grandfather of Henri-Charles de Coislin, Bishop of Metz. It became a part of the Fonds Coislin. It was added to the list of the New Testament manuscripts by J. J. Wettstein, who gave it the number 35.

Bernard de Montfaucon was the first who examined and described this manuscript. Then it was examined and described by Wettstein, Scholz, and Paulin Martin. C. R. Gregory saw the manuscript in 1885. The text of Revelation was collated by Hoskier (1929).

It is currently housed at the Bibliothèque nationale de France (Coislin, Gr. 199) in Paris.

See also 

 List of New Testament minuscules
 Biblical manuscripts
 Textual criticism

References

Further reading 

 Bernard de Montfaucon, Bibliotheca Coisliniana olim Segueriana, Paris: Ludovicus Guerin & Carolus Robustel, 1715, p. 250.
 Herman C. Hoskier, Concerning the Text of the Apocalypse 1 (London, 1929), pp. 32–33.

Greek New Testament minuscules
11th-century biblical manuscripts
Fonds Coislin